Suphisellus lineatus is a species of burrowing water beetle in the subfamily Noterinae. It was described by George Henry Horn in 1871 and is found in Belize, Guatemala, Mexico and the United States.

References

Suphisellus
Beetles described in 1871